The Tata Group is a multinational conglomerate based in India, with many subsidiary and joint venture companies.

Tata Sons Limited is the holding company of the Tata Group, and holds the bulk of shareholding in these companies. Tata Sons Ltd is the owner of the Tata name and the Tata trademarks, which are registered in India and several other countries.

About 86% of the equity capital of Tata Sons is held by philanthropic trusts endowed by members of the Tata family.  The biggest two of these trusts are the Sir Dorabji Tata Trust and Sir Ratan Tata Trust.

Subsidiaries
Notable subsidiary companies and joint ventures of the Tata Group include:
 Tata Chemicals
 Rallis India Limited – an agricultural research company 
 Brunner Mond
 British Salt
 Magadi Soda Company
 Tata Swach
 Tata Communications – a communication company
 VSNL International Canada
 Tata Communications Payment Solutions Limited – a payment solution service provider that owns Indicash ATM (the first white label ATM brand of India)
Tata Consultancy Services (TCS) – Asia's largest IT company and world's largest software and services company
 Computational Research Laboratories – Tata initiative in high performance computing
 C-Edge Technologies – TCS-SBI joint venture
 Tata Consumer Products – the world's second-largest tea business
 Tata Coffee
 Tetley
 Tata Salt
 Tata Starbucks – a joint venture between Tata Consumer Products and Starbucks (US)
 Tata Digital
BigBasket – grocery and essentials delivery service
Tata 1mg – online healthcare platform
Tata Neu – a Tata Group super-app
Tata Elxsi – product design and technology company
 Tata Motors – India's largest (and the world's fifth-largest) automobile company, the leader in India's commercial vehicle market with a market share of 45.1%
 Tata Motors Cars – Produces passenger cars under the Tata Motors Marque.
 Jaguar Land Rover – British company making Jaguar and Land Rover vehicles
 Tata Daewoo
 Tata Hispano – coach builder
 Tata Hitachi Construction Machinery
 Tata Marcopolo
 Tata Technologies – Engineering, Product Lifecycle Management, Information Technology, Automotive, Aerospace, Construction and Heavy Machinery, Manufacturing and Digital Manufacturing
Tata Passenger Electric Mobility
 Tata Power – India's largest private sector electricity producer
 Tata Power Solar
 Maithon Power
 Tata Power Delhi Dist Ltd
 TP Central Odisha Dist Ltd
 TP Western Odisha Dist Ltd
 TP Northern Odisha Dist Ltd
 Nelco Ltd – a satellite communication company
Tata Play – a Direct To Home service company in alliance with The Walt Disney Company and Temasek Holdings
 Tata Steel – the second-largest steel producer in India & Europe
Formerly Tata Steel Europe, since 2021 split into:
Tata Steel Netherlands (TSN)
Tata Steel UK
 Tata Steel BSL – a steel company formerly known as Bhushan Steel
Tata Bearings
 Tata Sponge Iron Ltd
Tata Tinplate
Tata Metaliks Ltd
 Tata Pigments – TATA Pigments Ltd (TPL) produces synthetic iron oxide pigments.
 Tata Colours 
 Mjunction – a Tata Steel and SAIL joint venture, India's Largest B2B E-Commerce company
 Voltas – a home appliances company specialising in air conditioning and cooling technology
 Infiniti Retail Cromā
 Indian Hotels Company Limited – an Indian hospitality company that manages a portfolio of hotels, resorts, jungle safaris, palaces, spas and in-flight catering services
 Taj Hotels
 Vivanta
 Ginger Hotels
 The Pierre
 Titan Company – a luxury products company started as a joint venture between Tata Group and Tamil Nadu Industrial Development Corporation (TIDCO)
 Tanishq – a jewellery brand in India
 Fastrack
Favre-Leuba
CaratLane
 Trent – a retail chain
Westside
Star Bazaar
Landmark Bookstores
Zudio
Zara – a joint venture between Trent and Inditex
 Tata Projects – an engineering, procurement and construction company
 Tata Consulting Engineers Ltd
Tata Housing Development Company – real estate development company
 Tata Value Homes Limited – operating in value and affordable segments
 Tata Realty & Infrastructure
 Tata Advanced Systems
 Tata Power SED
Tata Teleservices Telecommunications – Tata tele-business services
 Tata AIG – an insurance-based joint venture company with AIG
 Tata AIA Life Insurance – joint venture with AIA Group
 Tata Industries – business incubator for Tata Group ventures
Tata CLiQ – e-commerce website, selling apparel, footwear and electronics
 Flisom – thin-film solar cell manufacturer
 Inzpera Healthsciences
 Tata Capital – financial services and wealth management company
 Air India – largest international carrier out of India with an 18.6% market share
 AirAsia India – a scheduled passenger low cost airline
 Air India Express – a scheduled passenger low cost airline
 Vistara – Tata SIA Airlines Limited, operating as Vistara, an Indian full-service airline, is a joint venture between Tata Sons (51% stake) and Singapore Airlines (49%).
 Taj Air – chartered flights
 TRL Krosaki Refractories Limited – a refractory company, formerly Tata Refractories Limited with Krosaki Harima Corporation
 Tata AutoComp Systems – India's leading automotive components conglomerate
 TitanX-Powertrain Cooling
 Tata Investment Corp
 Tejas Networks – networking products manufacturer

Sports
 Jamshedpur FC – Jamshedpur Football Club which plays in Indian Super League the top-tier professional league in India

Educational and research institutes
Indian Institute of Science
National Centre for Performing Arts
Nettur Technical Training Foundation R D Tata Technical Education Centre Jamshedpur
Tata Ecotechnology Centre
Tata Institute of Fundamental Research
Tata Institute of Social Sciences
Tata Management Training Centre
Tata Memorial Hospital
Tata Medical Centre, Kolkata
The Energy and Resources Institute, formerly Tata Energy Research Institute
Tata Institute for Genetics and Society
Apprentice Training School, Tata Chemicals Mithapur
Kohli Center for Intelligent Systems

See also

References

 01
.Subsidiaries
Tata Group entities
.Subsidiaries